Baekseju (sold under the brand name Bek Se Ju) is a Korean glutinous rice-based fermented alcoholic beverage flavored with a variety of herbs, ginseng most prominent among them. The name comes from the legend that the healthful herbs in baekseju will result an individual to live up to 100 years old.

The drink is infused with ginseng and eleven other herbs, including licorice, omija (Schisandra chinensis), gugija (Chinese wolfberry), Astragalus propinquus root, ginger, and cinnamon.

Overview 
Baekseju is brewed using traditional methods, and has a mellow flavor, with a hint of ginseng.

It is often consumed with gui and other spicy dishes which are main flavors of Korean food. However, baekseju is considered to be a more old-fashioned variety of alcoholic beverage than soju or beer, and is less popular, possibly due to its image and high price. Baekseju is made by a company named Kooksoondang. It was a pocket recipe wine before its popularity. It had its traditional recipe but in order to make it sell on a broader market, some adjustments were made with new ingredients. It was first launched in 1992 along with the name of Jibong'yuseol. This was a success for the company. The reason behind the success was that at the time of its release there were only a couple of alcoholic beverages namely beer, soju and whiskey. This drink was perfect for those who wanted to drink without becoming inebriated.

See also 
Korean wine
List of Korean beverages

References 

 

Rice wine
Korean alcoholic drinks